Hsieh Yue-hsia (1944–2009) was a Taiwanese actress.

She was born Lin San-chiao is what became Taiping District, Taichung. Lin began training in dance at the age of four, with Hsieh Lien-zhi, and later took her mentor's surname. Hsieh Yue-hsia became known for her Taiwanese opera performances. In 2002, she received the Golden Bell Award for Best Actress in a Miniseries or Television Film.

Her son Wang Rong-yu founded  in 1993. Hsieh died on 4 January 2009.

References

External links

1944 births
2009 deaths
Actresses from Taichung
20th-century Taiwanese women singers
Taiwanese opera actresses
Taiwanese television actresses
20th-century Taiwanese actresses
Male impersonators in Taiwanese opera